EP2! is the second extended play by American rapper and producer JPEGMafia, released February 12, 2021 on Republic Records. It is the follow-up to EP!, a compilation of singles he released throughout 2020. EP2! was supported by two singles: "Last Dance!" and "Fix Urself!".

Background
JPEGMafia released several singles across the span of 2020, and compiled them into an EP, aptly titled EP!. It was released on his Bandcamp page on November 6, and on streaming services with the addition of one extra single on December 10. Shortly after the release, he announced EP2! on his Twitter account calling it "triumphant introvert music".

The EP was recorded May or June 2020 "around the time when people were posting black squares" over the course of three weeks, with him saying on Twitter "no samples I just locked myself in a room with a few synthesizers. 3 weeks top to bottom".

Release and promotion
The first single to release was "Last Dance!" on August 31, 2020, calling it the "final one". It did not appear on the track listing for EP!, suggesting it was going to release on a different project. On January 29, 2021, he released the single "Fix Urself!" accompanied by a music video. On February 5, he officially announced the release date and track listing. The album released February 12, 2021 and was supported by a YouTube livestream of a pre-recorded performance of the EP, along with a Q&A session afterwards where he answered questions from fans.

Track listing
All tracks written and produced by JPEGMafia, except "Panic Room", produced by JPEGMafia and James Blake.
 
Notes
 All titles are stylized in all caps.
 The Bandcamp version of the EP has "Intro!" and "Fix Urself" combined into one track.

References

JPEGMafia albums
2021 EPs
Albums produced by JPEGMafia
Albums produced by James Blake (musician)
Republic Records EPs
Albums recorded in a home studio